Kaijiang County is a county in the east of Sichuan Province, China. It is under the administration of Dazhou city. It has a population of 550,000, of which 87,000 in the urban area.

Kaijiang was  established in 553 and until 1914 it was named Xinning County (新宁县).

The county is known for breeding ducks and waterfowls, and for olive oil production. Culturally it has a strong tradition of feng shui.

Administrative divisions 
The county seat is Xinning Town. Kaijiang is subdivided in:

Climate

References

County-level divisions of Sichuan
Dazhou